Rosewell may refer to:

Places
Rosewell, Midlothian, former mining town in Midlothian, Scotland
Rosewell, Virginia, United States
Rosewell Plantation, in Gloucester County, Virginia, United States, home of members of the Page family

People
Benjamin Rosewell (attorney) (c. 1720-1782), Attorney of Throgmorton Street, London
Benjamin Rosewell (shipwright) (c. 1665-1737), Master Shipwright of Chatham Dockyard
Bridget Rosewell, British economist
Henry Rosewell (1590-1656), of Forde Abbey, Devon and grandson of William Rosewell
John Rosewell (1882-1938), pioneer Australian rugby union and rugby league player
John Rosewell (headmaster) (1635-1684), Headmaster of Eton College
Samuel Rosewell (1679-1722), nonconformist minister of Hackney, London
Thomas Rosewell (1630-1692), nonconformist minister of Rotherhithe, Surrey
Walter Rosewell (c. 1610-1658), Presbyterian minister of Chatham, Kent
William Rosewell (Solicitor-General) (c. 1520-1566), Solicitor-General to Queen Elizabeth I
William Rosewell (apothecary) (c.1606-c.1680), Soldier and Royal Apothecary
William Rosewell (gentleman) (c.1500-1570), of Loxton, Somerset

See also
Roswell (disambiguation)